Karl E. Wiegers (born 1953) is an American software engineer, consultant, and trainer in the areas of software development, management, and process improvement. He is the author of numerous books and articles mainly focused on software requirements, project management, process improvement, quality, design, and consulting. He is also the author of a forensic mystery novel titled The Reconstruction and a memoir of life lessons titled Pearls from Sand: How Small Encounters Lead to Powerful Lessons.

Biography 
Wiegers received a B.S. degree in chemistry from Boise State College (1973), and M.S. (1975) and Ph.D. (1977) degrees in organic chemistry from the University of Illinois. Wiegers spent 18 years, from 1979 until 1998, at Eastman Kodak Company as a photographic research scientist, software developer, software manager, and process and quality improvement leader.

In 1997, Wiegers started his own software process consulting and training company, Process Impact, which focuses on practical software process improvement.

See also 
 Software Requirements

Publications
 2022. Software Development Pearls: Lessons from Fifty Years of Software Experience. Addison-Wesley. 
2021. The Thoughtless Design of Everyday Things. J. Ross Publishing. 
 2019. Successful Business Analysis Consulting: Strategies and Tips for Going It Alone. J. Ross Publishing. 
 2017. The Reconstruction. Agent Q Bookworks. 
 2013. Software Requirements, 3rd Edition (with Joy Beatty). Microsoft Press. 
 2011. Pearls from Sand: How Small Encounters Lead to Powerful Lessons. Morgan James Publishing. 
 2007. Practical Project Initiation: A Handbook with Tools. Microsoft Press. 
 2006. More About Software Requirements: Thorny Issues and Practical Advice. Microsoft Press. 
 2003. Software Requirements, 2nd Edition. Microsoft Press. 
 2002. Peer Reviews in Software: A Practical Guide. Addison-Wesley. 
 1999. Software Requirements, 1st Edition. Microsoft Press. 
 1996. Creating a Software Engineering Culture. Dorset House Publishing.

References

External links
 Karl Wiegers' official home page

Living people
American software engineers
1953 births